American band Ivy has recorded material for six studio albums, one extended play (EP), and for various compilation albums and soundtracks. Formed in 1994, the musical trio consists of Dominique Durand, Andy Chase, and Adam Schlesinger. After releasing the EP Lately with Seed Records in 1994, the band recorded their debut album, Realistic, which was released in 1995. A pop album, lead single "Get Enough" was named a "Single of the Week" by British newspaper Melody Maker. After a brief hiatus, the band released their second album, Apartment Life, in 1997 after signing with Atlantic Records. In order to make the pop-influenced album, the group collaborated with a number of high-profile musicians, including Chris Botti, Lloyd Cole, James Iha, and Dean Wareham. The album was, however, a commercial disappointment for their record label, who dropped Ivy while they were touring. Two songs from Apartment Life ("I Get the Message" and "This Is the Day") received further attention after being included on the official soundtrack to the 1998 film, There's Something About Mary. Ivy signed to Nettwerk to release Long Distance in 2000; the album incorporated music from multiple genres, such as guitar pop, trip hop, and new wave. The third single released, "Edge of the Ocean", became Ivy's first song to enter a musical record chart, peaking at number 160 in the United Kingdom. Due to its popularity, Ivy considers it to be their signature song.

Their fourth album, Guestroom, was released in 2002 by Minty Fresh Records, featuring cover songs from artists like the Blow Monkeys, the Ronettes, Serge Gainsbourg, and Steely Dan. The "minimal" production was accompanied by a variety of instruments, such as synths and acoustics. In the Clear (2005) is the group's fifth album and second with Nettwerk. Featuring elements of pop, disco, and rock music, it takes influence from early 1960s songs and was compared to material released by Pet Shop Boys and Blondie. Following a six-year hiatus and the birth of Durand and Chase's first child, the group returned with 2011's All Hours after Durand's fear that their extended absence would cause their fans to lose interest. Musically an electronic pop album, it was backed by the release of three commercial singles ("Distant Lights", "Fascinated", and "Lost in the Sun"). Unlike their previously released albums, Durand did not receive any writing credits on All Hours, but the entire record was still written and produced by Chase and Schlesinger. The trio has writing credits on several other albums. They recorded covers of Joe Raposo's "Sing" for the 2002 children's album For the Kids and Vince Guaraldi's "Christmas Time Is Here" for Nettwerk's holiday album Maybe This Christmas Tree (2004). Producer Peter Nashel also had Ivy record "I'll Be Near You" for the soundtrack to the 2005 film Bee Season.

Songs 
All songs recorded by Ivy, except where noted.

References

External links 
Ivy songs at AllMusic

 
Ivy